All I Got is a studio album by Al Jarreau, issued in 2002 by GRP Records. The album rose to No. 4 on the Billboard Jazz Albums chart.

Singles
"Secrets of Love" (released August 13, 2002) reached No. 21 on the Billboard Adult R&B Songs chart.

Track listing

References

2002 albums
Al Jarreau albums
GRP Records albums